Ulrich (Uli) Beckerhoff (born 6 December 1947 in Münster) is a German jazz composer, trumpeter, and academic.

He led the Uli Beckerhoff Trio with Jasper van 't Hof and John Stanley Marshall as the other two members.

He teaches at the Folkwang University of the Arts in Essen.

Discography

As leader or co-leader
 Dedication (Fusion, 1981)
 Camporondo (Nabel, 1986) with Jasper van 't Hof, John Marshall
 Secret Obsession (Nabel, 1991) with John Abercrombie, Arild Andersen, John Marshall
 Private Life (Nabel, 1993)
 Cinema (Berthold Records, 2012) with Michael Berger, Stefan Ulrich
 Heroes (Dot Time Records, 2015)
 Diversity (Dot Time, 2018)

References

External links 
Official Website
 Folkwang Profile
Uli Beckerhoff discography, album releases & credits at Discogs

German jazz composers
Male jazz composers
German jazz trumpeters
Male trumpeters
1947 births
Living people
21st-century trumpeters
21st-century German male musicians